The 2022 ADAC GT4 Germany season is the fourth season of the ADAC GT4 Germany, a sports car championship created and organised by the ADAC. The season began on 23 April at Oschersleben and will end on 23 October at the Hockenheimring.

Calendar

Entry List

Results

Championship standings

Points system
Points were awarded to the top 10 classified finishers (excluding guest drivers) in each race. No points were awarded for pole position or fastest lap.

Drivers' standings